Adnan Hugo Boumous (born 24 July 1995) is a French-Moroccan professional footballer who plays as an attacking midfielder for Indian Super League club ATK Mohun Bagan. He is known for his playmaking ability and link-up play.

Club career

Early career
Born in Rennes, Boumous graduated from the youth academy of Laval and made his debut with the reserves in 2013 after having joined the youth team two years earlier. In May 2015, he signed his first professional contract with the club and was promoted to the senior team. On 22 May 2015, he made his first team debut in the last round of Ligue 2, scoring a goal after having substituted in a 3–0 victory over Charmois Niortais.

On 20 July 2016, Boumous moved abroad and joined Moroccan Botola club Moghreb Tétouan, after agreeing to a three-year deal.

FC Goa 
On 2 February 2018, he switched clubs and countries and joined Indian Super League franchise Goa as a replacement for Manuel Arana. Two days later, he made his debut in a 2–2 draw against NorthEast United FC. On 22 February, he scored his first goal in a 1–1 draw against Delhi Dynamos. He was the youngest foreign player in 2019-20, and he won the player of the tournament award in ISL-6.

Mumbai City 
On 17 October 2020, Boumous signed for Mumbai City on a two year deal, with a $200,000 transfer fee, the highest till that time in ISL.

ATK Mohun Bagan 
On 8 July 2021, Boumous signed for ATK Mohun Bagan on a 5 year deal for a record transfer fee of $280,000 breaking the record set by him in the previous season. He debuted for Mohun Bagan in the 2021–22 season opener against Kerala Blasters on 19 November, in which he scored twice in 4–2 win. As 2022–23 season began, he appeared with the club on 20 August against Rajasthan United at the 131st edition of Durand Cup, in which they were defeated by 3–2.

International career
In May 2016, Boumous was called up to the Morocco under-23 football team for a friendly match against Cameroon. However, he was expelled from the team by the technical director after a video of Boumous smoking shisha surfaced in social media.

Style of play
Goal.com wrote that Boumous "often picks the ball in the middle of the park or at times from an even deeper position...He can hold the ball and make those surging runs through the middle which makes him an exciting player to watch".

Career statistics

Club

Honours 
FC Goa
 Indian Super League League Winners Shield: 2019–20
 Super Cup: 2019

Mumbai City
 Indian Super League: 2020–21
 Indian Super League League Winners Shield: 2020–21

ATK Mohun Bagan
 Indian Super League: 2022–23

Individual
Indian Super League Golden Ball: 2019–20

References

External links
 Hugo Boumous: "It's not too late to catch up" 
 Hugo Boumous: "In India, I link business to great pleasure"
 Hugo Boumous at foot-national.com
 
 
 

1995 births
Living people
Footballers from Rennes
Moroccan footballers
Morocco youth international footballers
French footballers
French sportspeople of Moroccan descent
Association football midfielders
Ligue 2 players
Indian Super League players
Stade Lavallois players
FC Goa players
Mumbai City FC players
Moroccan expatriate footballers
French expatriate footballers
Expatriate footballers in India